The Michigan Grrrowl was a tier III Junior "A" ice hockey team and a member of the Midwest Junior Hockey League. The franchise was previously known as the NWO Grrrowl and Findlay Grrrowl

Franchise history

Findlay Grrrowl era
The franchise was founded in 2008 as the Findlay Grrrowl based in Findlay, Ohio, United States at the Huntington Bank Arena at the Hancock Rec Center.  The team was owned by Barry Soskin and Pat Pylypuik; while Dave Erickson served as head coach.  The team was an inaugural member of the United Junior Hockey League (UJHL).  The Grrrowl won the first and only UJHL Championship in the final game of the best-of-three final series with an OT win over the Jamestown Jets. Following the 2008-2009 UJHL season The Grrrowl and many former UJHL teams  left the United Junior Hockey League and joined the new Northern Junior Hockey League. After one season as the NJHL, the league disbanded after key members left the NJHL in late August 2010.

MWJHL era
The Grrrowl franchise was resurrected in 2012 by Pat Pylypuik as an inaugural member the AAU-sanctioned Midwest Junior Hockey League.  The team changed name to the Northwest Ohio (NWO) Grrrowl to reflect the team's move to Toledo, Ohio and the Team Toledo Ice House.

The team went through several large changes midway through the 2012-13 season. MR. Acquisitions and Management Group of Belleville, Michigan took the operation of the Grrrowl while Micheal Rumps became the head coach. The team also relocated to Allen Park, Michigan and the Allen Park Civic Arena midway through the season.  The team changed its name to the Michigan Grrrowl.

The franchise again went dormant after the 2012-13 MWJHL season while owners attempted to join a USA Hockey-sanctioned league.

Findlay hockey history
The market was previously served by the Findlay Freedom a semi-pro team that played in Findlay, Ohio from 2006-2008.
The University of Findlay fielded an ice hockey team in the CHA until 2004 and the city was the home of the Findlay Warriors of the Continental Hockey League in 1983-1984.

Regular season records

External links
 Michigan Grrrowl Website
 Findlay Grrrowl Website

Reference list

Hancock County, Ohio
Defunct ice hockey teams in the United States